Rathdown is a barony  in County Wicklow, Republic of Ireland.

Etymology
Rathdown barony derives its name from Rathdown Castle, located near Greystones (Irish: Ráth an Dúin, "rath of the dún"; anciently Ráth Oinn).

Location

Rathdown barony is located in northeastern County Wicklow, east of Kippure, north of the Glen of the Downs, south of the County Dublin border and opening onto the Irish Sea around Bray Head.

History
The Uí Briuin Cualann are noted very early here, with their territory extending into southern County Dublin.

List of settlements

Below is a list of settlements in Rathdown barony:
Bray
Enniskerry
Greystones

References

Baronies of County Wicklow